I 4 tassisti (The four taxi drivers) is a 1963 Italian comedy film directed by Giorgio Bianchi.

Cast 
 Aldo Fabrizi: Sor Gigi
 Peppino De Filippo: Pasquale Scognamiglio (taxi driver)
 Erminio Macario: Pomilio Barone
 Gino Bramieri: Baldassare Boldrini
 Didi Perego: Filomena
 Gianrico Tedeschi: killer dressed in blue
 Yvonne Furneaux: La donna ubriaca
 Carlo Delle Piane: man in filling station
 Graziella Granata: fake nun
 Margaret Lee : blonde girl in the taxi	
 Bruno Scipioni : men in garage

References

External links

 

1963 films
1963 comedy films
Italian comedy films
Films directed by Giorgio Bianchi
Films scored by Fiorenzo Carpi
1960s Italian films